Tapeina coronata is a species of beetle in the family Cerambycidae. It was described by Amédée Louis Michel Lepeletier and Jean Guillaume Audinet-Serville in 1828. It is known from Brazil, Argentina, and Paraguay.

Subspecies
 Tapeina coronata integra Marinoni, 1972
 Tapeina coronata coronata Lepeletier & Audinet-Serville in Latreille, 1828

References

Lamiinae
Beetles described in 1828
Taxa named by Amédée Louis Michel le Peletier
Taxa named by Jean Guillaume Audinet-Serville